This is a list of members of the Victorian Legislative Assembly from 2018 to 2022.

See also
 Women in the Victorian Legislative Assembly

References

Members of the Parliament of Victoria by term
21st-century Australian politicians
Victorian Legislative Assembly